Chhitkul is a village in Kinnaur district of Himachal Pradesh. During winters, the place mostly remains covered with the snow and the inhabitants move to lower regions of Himachal.

According to a recent study by Centre of Atmospheric Sciences at IIT Delhi, Chitkul has the cleanest air in India.

Geography
Chitkul, a village located on right bank of Baspa River, is the last village of the Baspa Valley and the last village on the old Hindustan-Tibet trade route. It is also the last point in India one can travel to without a permit.

Visitor's attractions
Of particular interest at Chitkul are its houses with either slate or wooden plank roofs, a Buddhist temple and a small tower. However, there has been an increased use of tin-roofs, especially the high school and the army/ITBP barracks.

The Kagyupa temple has a highly valued old image of the Shakyamuni Buddha, a Wheel of Life mandala and four Directional Kings on either side of the door. Chitkul is practically the last point of the famous Kinner Kailash Parikrama as one can hitch a hike from here onwards.

After one crosses over the 5,242 m high Charang Pass., it is a long and steep run down through slithery scree slopes to Chitkul(3,450m). The powerful goddess of Chitkul is the only non-Buddhist deity to which respect must be paid by the Parikrama pilgrims. It is believed that the local Deity is related to the Deity of Gangotri and till recently the locals would carry the Deity to Gangotri on foot over high mountain passes.  Chitkul is situated around 40 km from Karcham, the place where road bifurcates from Hindustan-Tibet Road (NH 22). The Sangla Valley is a delight for nature lovers; especially the stretch after Raksham and right up to Chitkul. The valley is extremely beautiful, on the left bank of the Baspa River are snow-clad mountains and on the right bank the whole terrain is full of apple orchards and wooden houses.

Chitkul is start point for Lamkhaga pass trek and Borasu pass trek. Nagasthi ITBP post is 4 km and Ranikanda meadows is 10 km trek from Chitkul.

Transport
Chitkul is around 569 km from the National capital Delhi and 28 km from Sangla.

Gallery

See also
 Chitkuli Kinnauri language
 Liar's Dice (film)

References

External links

 12 facts you probably didn’t know about Chitkul
Chitkul Travel Blog

Tourist attractions in Himachal Pradesh
Villages in Kinnaur district